The Athletics at the 2016 Summer Paralympics – Men's 400 metres T12 event at the 2016 Paralympic Games took place on 8–9 September 2016, at the Estádio Olímpico João Havelange.

Heats

Heat 1 
11:56 8 September 2016:

Heat 2 
12:04 8 September 2016:

Heat 3 
12:11 8 September 2016:

Heat 4 
12:18 8 September 2016:

Semifinals

Semifinal 1 
18:38 8 September 2016:

Semifinal 2 
18:46 8 September 2016:

Final 
19:31 9 September 2016:

Notes

Athletics at the 2016 Summer Paralympics
2016 in men's athletics